Rushville Township may refer to the following townships in the United States:

 Rushville Township, Schuyler County, Illinois
 Rushville Township, Rush County, Indiana